Hoshan may refer to:

 Hoshan, a village in Duru District, Tanzania
 Hoshan or Ho-shan, a former romanization of Heshan, various places in China